Christian Gourmelen (born 1 August 1940) is a French politician.

Gourmelen was born in Sainte-Foy-la-Grande, France, on 1 August 1940. He served as mayor of Osny from 1971 to 2011. For most of his career, he had been affiliated with the Republican Party and its successor, Liberal Democracy. However, Gourmelen announced in 2000 that he would not run for another term on the general council, due to disagreements with his party over previous monetary donations he had given the party and their financial support of his campaign. Gourmelen sat in the National Assembly between 1993 and 1997, representing Val-d'Oise's 2nd constituency.

References

1940 births
Living people
Mayors of places in Île-de-France
French general councillors
Deputies of the 10th National Assembly of the French Fifth Republic
21st-century French politicians
Republican Party (France) politicians
Liberal Democracy (France) politicians